Romania competed in the 2008 Summer Olympics, held in Beijing, China from August 8 to August 24, 2008. Romania intended to send 104 competitors to Beijing, although the delegation was reduced to 102 when two Romanian athletes were suspended for doping before the start of the Olympics. The Romanian delegation for Beijing was the smallest Romanian Olympic delegation since the 1989 Revolution. Romanians competed in 16 sports: athletics, archery, handball, gymnastics, wrestling, swimming, diving, weightlifting, fencing, table tennis, shooting, tennis, judo, boxing, kayak-canoeing, and rowing.

Medalists

| width=78% align=left valign=top |

| width=22% align=left valign=top |

Archery

Romania sent archers to the Olympics for the second time (and first since 1980), seeking the nation's first Olympic medal in the sport. Alexandru Bodnar earned the country its first qualifying spot in the men's competition by placing 29th in the 2007 World Outdoor Target Championships.

Athletics

The following athletes were selected for the Romanian team.

Men - Field events

Women - Track & road events

Women - Field events

Boxing

Romania qualified two boxers for the Olympic boxing tournament. Popescu qualified at the first European qualifying tournament. Gheorghe qualified at the second European continental qualifying tournament.

Canoeing

Sprint

Qualification Legend: QS = Qualify to semi-final; QF = Qualify directly to final

Diving 

Men

Women

Fencing

Men

Women

Gymnastics

Artistic
Men
Team

Individual finals

Women
Team

* Only two gymnasts per country may advance to a final.

Individual finals

Handball

Women's tournament

Roster

Group play

Quarterfinal

Classification semifinal

7th–8th place

Judo

Rowing 

Romania qualified the following boats:

Women

Qualification Legend: FA=Final A (medal); FB=Final B (non-medal); FC=Final C (non-medal); FD=Final D (non-medal); FE=Final E (non-medal); FF=Final F (non-medal); SA/B=Semifinals A/B; SC/D=Semifinals C/D; SE/F=Semifinals E/F; QF=Quarterfinals; R=Repechage

Shooting 

Men

Women

Swimming 

Men

Women

Table tennis

Singles

Team

Tennis

Weightlifting

Wrestling 

Men's freestyle

 Gheorghiță Ștefan originally finished fifth, but in November 2016, he was promoted to bronze due to disqualification of Soslan Tigiev.

Men's Greco-Roman

Women's freestyle

See also
Romania at the 2008 Summer Paralympics

References

Nations at the 2008 Summer Olympics
2008
Summer Olympics